
Fiannamail mac Máele Tuile (died 680) was a King of Leinster from the Uí Máil branch of the Laigin. He was the great-grandson of Áed Dibchine mac Senaig (died 595), a previous king and grandson of  Rónán Crach, possibly the Leinster king mentioned in the saga "Fingal Rónáin" (The Kinslaying of Rónán).

His exact accession date is uncertain. The Book of Leinster gives him a reign of 13 years and the death obit of Fáelán mac Colmáin (died 666) is given as 666 in the Irish annals.

In 677 the Laigin fought with the high king Fínsnechta Fledach (died 695) of the Síl nÁedo Sláine at the Battle of Loch Gabor (Lagore, County Meath).
There was mutual slaughter on both sides but Finsnechta emerged the victor. In 680 Fiannamail was slain by one of his own people named Foichsechán at the instigation of the high king Finsnechta.

Fiannamail was ancestor to the Uí Théig (O'Tighe) north of Uí Máil territory just west of the Wicklow Mountains.

He is a recurring character in Peter Tremayne's Sister Fidelma mysteries.

Notes

See also
Kings of Leinster

References

 Annals of Ulster at CELT: Corpus of Electronic Texts at University College Cork
 Annals of Tigernach at CELT: Corpus of Electronic Texts at University College Cork
 Byrne, Francis John (2001), Irish Kings and High-Kings, Dublin: Four Courts Press, 
 Book of Leinster,Rig Laigin at CELT: Corpus of Electronic Texts at University College Cork

External links
CELT: Corpus of Electronic Texts at University College Cork

Kings of Leinster
7th-century Irish monarchs
680 deaths
Year of birth unknown